Jackson Heights is a neighborhood within the district of East Tampa, which represents District 5 of the Tampa City Council. Demographically, The neighborhood did not report separately. Jackson Heights boundaries are roughly 40th Street to the east, Hillsborough Avenue to the north, and 30th Street to the west.

See also
East Tampa

References

External links
City of Tampa
Jackson Heights Cemetery

Neighborhoods in Tampa, Florida